is a junior college in Sakai-ku, Sakai Sakai, Osaka, Osaka Prefecture, Japan. It is part of the Midori Gakuen network.

The origin of the institute was the Osaka Childcare Laboratory, established in 1979. In 1985, a professional school for childcare was founded. Later, a professional school for carework was founded. In 2002, the professional school became a junior college.

External links
 Osaka Junior College of Social Health and Welfare

Educational institutions established in 2002
Japanese junior colleges
Private universities and colleges in Japan
Universities and colleges in Osaka Prefecture
2002 establishments in Japan
Sakai, Osaka